William Price (born October 7, 1987) is an American male volleyball player. He was part of the United States men's national volleyball team. On club level he played for Beijing Baic Motor Men's Volleyball Team.

References

External links
 profile at FIVB.org

1987 births
Living people
American men's volleyball players
Place of birth missing (living people)
Penn State Nittany Lions men's volleyball players
George Mason Patriots men's volleyball players